Sedna may refer to:
Sedna (mythology), the Inuit goddess of the sea
90377 Sedna, a trans-Neptunian dwarf planet
Sedna (beverage), a tonic wine, formerly made in Belfast
Sedna (database), a native XML database
Doriprismatica sedna, a species of nudibranch
Sedna Finance, a structured investment vehicle
Sedna Planitia, a landform on the planet Venus

See also
Sedna IV (vessel) a modern sailing ship
Sétna (disambiguation)